The New Zealand Stakes currently run as the Bonecrusher New Zealand Stakes is a Group One thoroughbred horse race in New Zealand.

It is run at Ellerslie racecourse on the final day of the Auckland Cup Week Carnival in March for a stake of $200,000.

History

The New Zealand Stakes was introduced as a weight-for-age race in the 1974/75 New Zealand racing season.

It has been run under the following names depending on sponsors:

 Second Century Stakes (1975-1976)
 Air New Zealand Stakes (1977-1990)
 Television New Zealand Stakes (1994)
 Trackside Sales Stakes (1995-1996)
 Harrah’s Stakes (1997)
 Lion Red Stakes (1999-2002)
 Asian Racing Federation Stakes (2003)
 Darley Stakes (2005)
 Starcraft New Zealand Stakes (2006-2007)
 First Sovereign Trust New Zealand Stakes (2008)
 Sky City New Zealand Stakes (2009-2010)
 Nicolas Feuillatte Stakes (2011)
 Lindauer New Zealand Stakes (2012-2014)
 Ronald McDonald House Charities New Zealand Stakes (2015)
 Bonecrusher New Zealand Stakes (2016-Present)

It is raced on the same day as two of New Zealand’s other most important races: the Ellerslie Sires Produce Stakes and the Auckland Cup.

Race results

The following are the results of the Bonecrusher New Zealand Stakes:

See also

 Thoroughbred racing in New Zealand
 Auckland Cup
 Zabeel Classic
 New Zealand International/Herbie Dyke Stakes

References

http://www.ellerslie.co.nz

Horse races in New Zealand
Events in Auckland